Wolbong Market is a traditional street market in Dong-gu, Ulsan, South Korea. The market contains many shops that sell fruit, vegetables, meat, fish, breads, clothing, and Korean traditional medicinal items. There are also many small restaurants and street-food stalls. The market is a popular shopping area for both locals and tourists.

History
Due to the emergence of large discount stores in the area, the city government began a market-revival initiative in the early 2000s to improve the infrastructure around Ulsan's traditional markets, while attempting to maintain their traditional atmosphere. The first set of Wolbong's renovations finished on May 3, 2003 and included the installation of a 140 m long, 4–8 m wide arcade to keep shoppers dry in rainy weather. Also included in the renovations were window-sill replacements, electrical improvements, toilet repair, roof waterproofing, construction reinforcements, the addition of fire-fighting facilities, and other remodeling jobs. The total cost of this renovation was KRW950,000,000 (US$760,000 in 2005). A second renovation was conducted in 2007 and included the installation of new sewer pipes and manhole covers.

See also
 List of markets in South Korea
 List of South Korean tourist attractions

References

Dong District, Ulsan
Retail markets in Ulsan
South Korean companies established in 1980
Food markets in South Korea
Retail companies established in 1980